Claude-Ange-Joseph Calabrese (February 18, 1867 – May 7, 1932) was the Italian Bishop of the Roman Catholic Diocese of Aosta from his appointment by Pope Benedict XV on May 7, 1920 until his death on May 7, 1932.

Biography 

Born in Fourneaux in 1867, he was ordained priest in 1889 and became theologal canon of Susa Cathedral.

He was appointed bishop of Aosta on May 7, 1920. He died on May 7, 1932, at the age of 65.

References

External links
Profile of Mons. Calabrese www.catholic-hierarchy.org 
Official Page of diocese of Aosta

1867 births
1932 deaths
Bishops of Aosta
People from Rhône-Alpes
People from Savoie